Cenipa can refer to:
Centro de Investigação e Prevenção de Acidentes Aeronáuticos
A species of Canidae